Jima is a village in the Pandaguo area of Lamu County, Kenya. It is approximately 2 kilometers from Pandanguo.

History
On July 8, 2017, approximately 15 al-Shabaab terrorists from Somalia beheaded nine male civilians in the village, according to Kenyan government official James Ole Serian.

References

Populated places in Lamu County